Wootton Creek is a tidal estuary that flows into the Solent on the north coast of the Isle of Wight. The estuary has also been known in the past as "Fishbourne Creek", "Wootton River" and "Wootton Haven".

At the mouth of the estuary is the Wightlink car ferry terminal for connections to Portsmouth. On the west bank of the creek is the village of Wootton, whilst on the east bank is the village of Fishbourne. The estuary is bridged by the main Ryde to Newport road, where there once was a tide mill. The estuary is not navigable south of the bridge, and tide controls means that water is retained south of the bridge most of the time, in the old mill pond.

Since 1993 Wootton Creek and the adjacent Ryde Sands have been designated as SSSIs due to their wide range of intertidal sand flats.

References

External links

 Information on estuaries from the Isle of Wight Council
View Nautical Charts of Wootton Creek and Approaches

Estuaries of England
Rivers of the Isle of Wight
Ports and harbours of the Isle of Wight